K. V. Tirumalesh (1940 – 30 January 2023) was an Indian poet, writer and critic in the Kannada and English languages, and a retired professor. For his collections of poems Akshaya Kavya in Kannada (2010), he was awarded the Sahitya Akademi Award.

Early life
Tirumalesh was born in 1940 in the village of Karadka in the Madras Presidency of British India (present-day Kasargod district, of the Indian State of Kerala). He held a master's degree in English literature and a doctorate degree in linguistics. He taught at the English and Foreign Languages University, Hyderabad.

Career
Tirumalesh's career as a writer began in the 1960s when he wrote the collection of poems MukhavaaDagalu (Masks, 1968) in the Navya style, the modernist school of writing in Kannada literature. His Mahaprasthana (1990) was said to be the result of his exploration of ways of transcending the constraints of modernism. It dealt with the theme of disillusionment after victory, with the mythological heavenward journey of the Pandavas as the setting.

Tirumalesh's collection of poems, Akshaya Kavya (2010), as described by him is an "epic fragment". He elaborated: "Aksh aya Kavya imbibes this spirit in an extensive way . It is a long narrative sans story, sans didacticism, sans any aim, a sort of poetic sojourn with a lot of gaps. It is long and fragmentary at the same time: my models are Ezra Pound, William Carlos Williams and Charles Olson." The work won him the Sahitya Akademi Award for Kannada in 2015.

Death
Tirumalesh died in Hyderabad on 30 January 2023, at the age of 82.

Bibliography

Poetry collections
 Mukhavaadagalu/ಮುಖವಾಡಗಳು (Masks, 1968)
 Vathara/ವಠಾರ (Apartments, 1969)
 Mahaprasthana/ಮಹಾಪ್ರಸ್ಥಾನ (The Great March, 1971)
 Mukhamukhi/ಮುಖಾಮುಖಿ (Face to Face, 1978)
 "Avadha/ಅವಧ" (1988)
 "Paapiyoo... /ಪಾಪಿಯೂ" (1993)
 Akshaya Kavya/ಅಕ್ಷಯ ಕಾವ್ಯ (2010)
 "Aayda Kavitegalu/ಆಯ್ದ ಕವಿತೆಗಳು" (2011)
 "Arabbi/ಅರಬ್ಬಿ" (2015)

Novels/short stories
 "Tarangantaranga/ತರಂಗಾಂತರಂಗ"
 "Dawn Quixote/ಡಾನ್ ಕ್ವಿಕ್ಸೇೂಟ್"

Essays/criticism
 "Sammukha/ಸಮ್ಮುಖ"
 "Vyakti Mattu Paramparegalu/ವ್ಯಕ್ತಿ ಮತ್ತು ಪರಂಪರೆಗಳು"
 "Ullekha/ಉಲ್ಲೇಖ"
 "Ala-Nirala/ಆಳ-ನಿರಾಳ" (1-4)
 "Kavya Karana/ಕಾವ್ಯ ಕಾರಣ"
 "Namma Kannada/ನಮ್ಮ ಕನ್ನಡ"
 "Vagartha/ವಾಗರ್ಥ"
 "Vaachanashale/ವಾಚನಶಾಲೆ

Non-fiction 
 Derrida's Heel of Achilles and Other Essays
 Grammar and Communication: Essays on the Form and Function of Language (1999)
 The Landscape of Language: Issues in Kannada Linguistics (2000)

References

External links
 Works of KV Tirumalesh, Chilume.com
 A poet - within and without, The Hindu
 "I take my own writing as a big protest; I cannot conceive of a greater protest", The Telegraph
 Seven Kannada poems of K. V. Tirumalesh translated into English by S. Jayasrinivasa Rao.  Published in CAESURAE: POETICS OF CULTURAL TRANSLATION VOL3: 1 (ISSN 2454-9495)Combined Volumes (3: 2 & 4:1) (ISSN 2454-9495) 2019-2020
 Three Kannada poems of K. V. Tirumalesh translated into English by S. Jayasrinivasa Rao.  Published in MUSE INDIA: The Literary Journal (ISSN 0975-1815) Hemanta Ritu – Pre-Winter, Issue 100 (Nov-Dec 2021)
 Kannada Modernism in Hyderabad: 5 Poems by K. V. Tirumalesh (translated into English by S. Jayasrinivasa Rao). Published in MAIDAANAM: CULTURE, HISTORY, AND POLITICS FROM THE DECCAN AND SOUTHERN INDIA (June 6, 2022)

1940 births
2023 deaths
Writers from Karnataka
Kannada poets
Kannada-language writers
Kannada people
20th-century Indian poets
Indian literary critics
Writers from Kerala
Novelists from Kerala
People from Kasaragod district
Recipients of the Sahitya Akademi Award in Kannada
20th-century Indian novelists
20th-century Indian short story writers